Mazzaferro is a surname. Notable people with the surname include:

 Francesco Mazzaferro (born 1940), Italian criminal
 Peter Mazzaferro (born 1930), American football coach